is a passenger railway station located in the city of Wakayama, Wakayama Prefecture, Japan, operated by the private railway operator Nankai Electric Railway.

Lines
Higashi-Matsue Station is served by the Kada Line, and has the station number "NK44-1".It is located 2.6 kilometers from the terminus of the line at Kinokawa Station and 5.2 kilometers from Wakayamashi Station.

Station layout
The station consists of one island platform connected to the station building by a level crossing.

Platforms

Adjacent stations

History
Higashi-Matsue Station opened on December 1, 1930.

Passenger statistics
In fiscal 2019, the station was used by an average of 947 passengers daily (boarding passengers only).

Surrounding Area
 Nippon Steel & Sumitomo Metal Wakayama Steel Works.

See also
List of railway stations in Japan

References

External links
  

Railway stations in Japan opened in 1930
Railway stations in Wakayama Prefecture
Wakayama (city)